Anna Szymul is a paralympic athlete from Poland competing mainly in category T46 sprint events.

Anna has competed in three Paralympics, her first in 1996 Summer Paralympics she competed in the 100m and 200m but failed to win a medal.  In 2000 Anna saw success winning silver in both the 100m and 400m and a bronze in the 200m.  2004 saw Anna go one better winning three silver medals in the 100m, 200m and 400m.

References

Paralympic athletes of Poland
Athletes (track and field) at the 2000 Summer Paralympics
Athletes (track and field) at the 2004 Summer Paralympics
Paralympic silver medalists for Poland
Paralympic bronze medalists for Poland
Polish female sprinters
Living people
Place of birth missing (living people)
Medalists at the 2000 Summer Paralympics
Medalists at the 2004 Summer Paralympics
Year of birth missing (living people)
Paralympic medalists in athletics (track and field)
20th-century Polish people
21st-century Polish people
Sprinters with limb difference
Paralympic sprinters